Ofrynio is a village and part of the municipal unit of Orfano in the southwest of the Kavala regional unit, Greece. The village has a population of 758 (2011).

With the Kapodistrias program, it joined the Orfano municipality, and formerly belonged to the community of Ofrynio.

See also
List of settlements in the Kavala regional unit

References

Populated places in Kavala (regional unit)